Nyírkércs is a village in Szabolcs-Szatmár-Bereg County, Hungary.

References

Populated places in Szabolcs-Szatmár-Bereg County